Acritopappus is a genus of flowering plants in the family Asteraceae described as a genus in 1972.

The entire genus is endemic to Brazil.

Taxonomy

Species
, Plants of the World online has 19 accepted species:

Selected synonyms include:
 Acritopappus hagei  — synonym of Acritopappus heterolepis

References

Eupatorieae
Asteraceae genera
Endemic flora of Brazil